TVR Tower is an office building located in the city of Bucharest, Romania. It stands at a height of 50 meters and has 13 floors, with a total surface area of 11,000 m2. The building is owned by the Romanian Television, which uses the antenna on the roof of the building to transmit video signal to the surrounding area. Construction of the building began in 1966 and was completed in 1968.

External links

Skyscraper office buildings in Bucharest
Office buildings completed in 1968